Neal Preston (born 1952) is a photographer based in Los Angeles, California.  Preston is known primarily for his photographs of rock musicians.  He has worked closely with such artists as Led Zeppelin, Queen, The Who, Bruce Springsteen, Fleetwood Mac, Michael Jackson, Whitney Houston, and many others.

Life and career
Preston was born in New York City. He attended Forest Hills High School in Queens, New York.  Photography started out as a hobby for him, and even before graduating from high school in 1970, he was already shooting rock shows throughout the New York City area and had formed a small photography company, earning assignments from a variety of publications.  In October 1971, Preston moved permanently to Los Angeles.  Over the past four decades, his work has been featured in countless magazines and used on the covers of hundreds of music-related releases.

In 1985, Preston was chosen as one of the official photographers for Bob Geldof’s “Live Aid” concert at London’s Wembley Stadium.  In 1988, he was official tour photographer for Amnesty International’s “A Conspiracy of Hope” international tour featuring Bruce Springsteen, Sting, and Peter Gabriel.  His archives were the primary source of still photographs for over 50 episodes of VH-1’s music documentary series, Behind the Music.

Preston has also worked extensively in non-music fields, shooting a wide variety of subjects for both editorial and commercial clients. In 1978 he joined the New York-based photo agency Camera 5.  In 1979, he began a long association with People magazine, with over 700 shoots to his credit.  He has also shot covers of Newsweek, Time, and Rolling Stone, and many other magazines and books.  In sports, Preston has photographed six Olympic Games, and covered heavyweight boxing, NBA basketball, World Cup soccer, professional figure skating, and Major League Baseball.

Preston has served as both unit and special photographer for a string of feature films directed by his long-time friend Cameron Crowe, including Almost Famous, Vanilla Sky, Elizabethtown, and We Bought A Zoo.

Preston is the author of several books devoted to his photography of Led Zeppelin, whom he first shot in 1970 and for whom he later served as official tour photographer.

Preston remains active today — shooting music, glamour, and movie stills; managing his archives; and mounting gallery exhibitions of his work.

External links 
 Official Site. (As of 2014-11-27, it apparently hasn't been updated since 2009.)
 Neal Preston Interview NAMM Oral History Library (2018)

1952 births
Living people
American photographers
Movie stills photographers
Rolling Stone people
American male writers
Forest Hills High School (New York) alumni